In Greek mythology, Polybus (Ancient Greek: Πόλυβος) was the 20th king of Sicyon who reigned for 40 years.

Family 
Polybus was the son of Hermes and Chthonophyle, daughter of the eponym of Sicyon. He had a daughter Lysimache or Lysianassa whom he gave in marriage to Talaus of Argos, son of King Bias. Some authors considered the fisherman Glaucus to be Polybus's son by Euboea, daughter of Larymnus.

Mythology 
Polybus inherited the throne of Sicyon from his grandfather and during his reign, his grandson Adrastus came to him fleeing from Argos. Afterwards, at the death of Polybus, Adrastus succeeded his grandfather as the new ruler of the city.

Notes

Children of Hermes
Princes in Greek mythology
Mythological kings of Sicyon

References 

 Athenaeus of Naucratis, The Deipnosophists or Banquet of the Learned. London. Henry G. Bohn, York Street, Covent Garden. 1854. Online version at the Perseus Digital Library.
 Athenaeus of Naucratis, Deipnosophistae. Kaibel. In Aedibus B.G. Teubneri. Lipsiae. 1887. Greek text available at the Perseus Digital Library.
 Pausanias, Description of Greece with an English Translation by W.H.S. Jones, Litt.D., and H.A. Ormerod, M.A., in 4 Volumes. Cambridge, MA, Harvard University Press; London, William Heinemann Ltd. 1918. . Online version at the Perseus Digital Library
 Pausanias, Graeciae Descriptio. 3 vols. Leipzig, Teubner. 1903.  Greek text available at the Perseus Digital Library.

Kings in Greek mythology
Sicyonian characters in Greek mythology